Lewis Erskine Wyndham 'Tip' Williams (28 November 1900 – 24 April 1974) was a Welsh cricketer.  Williams was a right-handed batsman who bowled right-arm fast-medium.  He was born at Bonvilston, Glamorgan.  He was educated in his early years at the Oratory School.

Williams made his first-class debut for Glamorgan in 1928 against Oxford University.  From 1928 to 1930, he made 4 first-class appearances, with his final first-class appearance for the county coming against Oxford University.  In his 4 first-class matches, he scored 145 runs at a batting average of 24.16, with a single half century high score of 53*.  In the field he also took a single catch  Through his close links to the county club, he was influential in bringing first-class cricket to Cowbridge Cricket Ground.

Williams died at St Hilary, Glamorgan on 24 April 1974.

Family
Williams' father-in-law Robert Knight played first-class cricket for Oxford University from 1878 to 1880.

References

External links
Tip Williams at Cricinfo
Tip Williams at CricketArchive

1900 births
1974 deaths
Cricketers from the Vale of Glamorgan
Glamorgan cricketers
Welsh cricketers